Kedrovy is an urban locality (an urban-type settlement) in Yemelyanovsky District of Krasnoyarsk Krai, Russia, located  from Krasnoyarsk, the administrative center of the krai. Population:  5,223 (2002 Census).

History
Until January 1, 2007, Kedrovy had closed status.

Administrative and municipal status
Within the framework of administrative divisions, Kedrovy is incorporated within Yemelyanovsky District as an urban-type settlement—an administrative unit equal in status to that of the selsoviets. As a municipal division, Kedrovy is incorporated separately as Kedrovy Urban Okrug.

References

Notes

Sources

Urban-type settlements in Krasnoyarsk Krai
Yemelyanovsky District
